David Mohney FAIA is an American architect, urbanist, writer, and dean at Kean University and Wenzhou-Kean University.

Biography
He is a fellow of the American Institute of Architects, holds a M.Arch from Princeton University School of Architecture and attended Harvard University to study Fine Arts, where he received his A.B.. He is the dean at Kean University and Wenzhou-Kean University for The Michael Graves College and previously the dean for University of Kentucky College of Design. He has taught at the Institute for Architecture and Urban Studies in New York City, the Graduate School of Design at Harvard, and the Southern California Institute of Architecture in Los Angeles.

He has contributed to the architectural discourse throughout his career through his authorship and continued dialog with notable personalities within the architectural discourse such as:  Paul Goldberger, contributing editor at Vanity Fair, educators Peter Eisenman, Monica Ponce de Leon, and Anthony Vidler. He had a role in the establishment of The Michael Graves College, has been a juror for the American Institute of Architecture Gold Medal and secretary for the Curry Stone Design Prize.

Publications
The Houses of Philip Johnson. 2004. By Stover Jenkins, Mohney. Photographer Steven Brooke. Afterword by Neil Levine. .
Seaside: Making a Town in America. New York: Princeton Architectural, 1991. By Mohney and Keller Easterling. .

References

External links
Interview in Architect Magazine
Deans List: David Mohney of the Kean University's Michael Graves School of Architecture Archinect interview
Newsmaker: David Mohney, Acting Dean of the Michael Graves School of Architecture article in Architectural Record

Living people
21st-century American architects
Princeton University School of Architecture alumni
Harvard University faculty
Kean University faculty
University of Kentucky faculty
Southern California Institute of Architecture faculty
Harvard College alumni
Fellows of the American Institute of Architects
Year of birth missing (living people)